Count Eduard Clam-Gallas (in Prague – , in Vienna) was an Austrian general. He was the eldest son of Count Christian Christoph Clam-Gallas (1771–1838), patron of Beethoven, and Countess Josephine Clary-Aldringen (1777–1828).

Career 
In 1823 Clam-Gallas joined the Army, at first as a Rittmeister (Captain) of the 1st Cavalry Regiment in 1831, then Commander (1835), Colonel (1840) and General in Prague (1846).

In 1848, called to Italy under the orders of General Joseph Radetzky, he commanded a brigade which distinguished itself at Santa Lucia, Vicenza and the Battle of Custoza. He was decorated with the Military Order of Maria Theresa and promoted to Field Marshal Lieutenant (equivalent of two-star general).

In April 1849 he became commander of the Transylvanian Army Corps which needed to return to Turkey (7,000 infantry, 1,600 horse and 36 cannon). In this month there were a few battles between Lüders, Józef Bem and Sándor Gál. During the Transylvanian summer campaign, Clam-Gallas was defeated by Bem, but after that was able to defeat Sándor Gál and his Székels Army. After occupying Székely Land he joined Lüders and together they defeated Bem at Segesvár.

In 1850, he was head of the I Army Corps of Bohemia in Vienna, and in the Second Italian War of Independence (1859) took part in the Battle of Magenta and the Battle of Solferino. This army corps was one of the first to be repelled, but this failure had no personal consequences for Clam-Gallas, who was promoted to General der Kavallerie.

In 1861 he was admitted to the Aulic Council before becoming, in 1865, Imperial Hofmeister.

At the start of the Austro-Prussian War Clam-Gallas, still in command of I Corps, was given command of units (60.000 men) detached from North Army, called Iser Army and consisting out of his own I Corps, the retreating Royal Saxon Army Corps, the Austrian brigade evacuated out of Holstein, and an Austrian light cavalry division. In the course of the War, he suffered defeats at Podol, Münchengrätz and Jičín. After reuniting his force with North Army under Ludwig von Benedek he reverted to command of I Corps. He was relieved of his command and replaced by Count Leopold Gondrecourt in the early morning of 3 July 1866 and thus took no part in the defeat of the Austrian main army at Königgrätz that day.

For his defeat at Jičín he was court-martialled, but he was acquitted because of his position in society. He spent his final years in retirement in Frýdlant and Liberec in Bohemia (now the Czech Republic).

Family 
In 1850 he married Clothilde von Dietrichstein (1828-1899), heiress of Prince Joseph-Franz von Dietrichstein (1798-1858) and sister-in-law of Alexander von Mensdorff-Pouilly, a senior minister of the Austrian Empire and a brother-in-arms during the Battle of Magenta. They had one son, Franz and two daughters, Eduardine and Clotilde.

Bibliography 
 
 
 
 
 

1805 births
1891 deaths
Hungarian Revolution of 1848
People of the Revolutions of 1848
Austrian generals
Bohemian nobility
Knights of the Golden Fleece of Austria
Knights Cross of the Military Order of Maria Theresa